The Schriver House is a historic house on the east side of Carter Lane in Subiaco, Arkansas.  It is a -story wood-frame structure, with a side gable roof and weatherboard siding.  It is a vernacular version of a double pen, whose front porch has been ornamented with Queen Anne-style gingerbread brackets and turned posts.  Built about 1885, it is one of the small community's finer examples of Queen Anne architecture, and one of the last surviving elements of the defunct community of Spielerville, which was located to the north.

The house was listed on the National Register of Historic Places in 1995.

See also
National Register of Historic Places listings in Logan County, Arkansas

References

Houses on the National Register of Historic Places in Arkansas
National Register of Historic Places in Logan County, Arkansas
Queen Anne architecture in Arkansas
Houses completed in 1885
Houses in Logan County, Arkansas